David L. Banks is an American statistician. He is a former editor of the Journal of the American Statistical Association; a founding editor of the journal Statistics, Politics and Policy; and a co-editor of the monograph Statistical Methods for Human Rights. He is a fellow of the Institute of Mathematical Statistics and the Royal Statistical Society. He has been a member of the board of directors of the American Statistical Association, and he is a past-President of the Classification Society. He has taught at the University of Cambridge and at Carnegie Mellon University; he was also Chief Statistician of the U.S. Department of Transportation. Additionally, he  has served on six National Academies panels.

David Banks obtained an M.S. in Applied Mathematics from Virginia Tech in 1982, followed by a Ph.D. in Statistics in 1984. He won an NSF Postdoctoral Research Fellowship in the Mathematical Sciences, which he took at Berkeley. In 1986 he was a visiting assistant lecturer at the University of Cambridge, and then joined the Department of Statistics at Carnegie Mellon in 1987. In 1997 he went to the National Institute of Standards and Technology, then served as chief statistician of the U.S. Department of Transportation, and finally joined the U.S. Food and Drug Administration in 2002. In 2003, he returned to academics at Duke University and is currently the director of the Statistical and Applied Mathematical Sciences Institute. David Banks was the coordinating editor of the Journal of the American Statistical Association. He co-founded the journal Statistics and Public Policy and served as its editor. He co-founded the American Statistical Association’s Section on National Defense and Homeland Security, and has chaired that section, as well as the sections on Risk Analysis and on Statistical Learning and Data Mining. He has published 74 refereed articles, edited eight books, and written four monographs. 

His research areas include models for dynamic networks, dynamic text networks, adversarial risk analysis (i.e., Bayesian behavioral game theory), human rights statistics, agent-based models, forensics, and certain
topics in high-dimensional data analysis.

Banks is currently Professor of the Practice of Statistics at Duke University. In addition, Banks is in charge of the Modeling in the Economic and Social Sciences Focus Cluster, part of Duke's Freshman FOCUS Program. In 2015, he received the ASA Founders Award (the highest award made by the American Statistical Association).

External links
 Curriculum Vitae

1956 births
Living people
American statisticians
Fellows of the American Statistical Association
Fellows of the Institute of Mathematical Statistics
Fellows of the Royal Statistical Society